Inger-Johanne Tveter is a Norwegian handball player. She played 67 matches for the Norway women's national handball team between 1966 and 1974.  She participated at the 1971 and 1973 World Women's Handball Championship.

References

Year of birth missing (living people)
Possibly living people
Norwegian female handball players